Einstein Telescope (ET) or Einstein Observatory, is a proposed third-generation ground-based gravitational wave detector, currently under study by some institutions in the European Union. It will be able to test Einstein's general theory of relativity in strong field conditions and realize precision gravitational wave astronomy.

The ET is a design study project supported by the European Commission under the Framework Programme 7 (FP7). It concerns the study and the conceptual design for a new research infrastructure in the emergent field of gravitational-wave astronomy.

Motivation
The evolution of the current gravitational wave detectors  Advanced Virgo and Advanced LIGO, as second generation detectors, is well defined. Currently they have been upgraded to their so-called enhanced level and they are expected to reach their design sensitivity in the next few years. LIGO detected gravitational waves in 2015 and Virgo joined this experimental success with the first gravitational wave observed by three detectors GW170814 and shortly after with the first detection of a binary neutron star merger GW170817. Nevertheless, the sensitivity needed to test Einstein's theory of gravity in strong field conditions or to realize a precision gravitational wave astronomy, mainly of massive stellar bodies or of highly asymmetric (in mass) binary stellar systems, goes beyond the expected performances of the advanced detectors and of their subsequent upgrades. For example, the fundamental limitations at low frequency of the sensitivity of the second generation detectors are given by the seismic noise, the related gravitational gradient noise (so-called Newtonian noise) and the thermal noise of the suspension last stage and of the test masses.

To circumvent these limitations new infrastructures are necessary: an underground site for the detector, to limit the effect of the seismic noise, and cryogenic facilities to cool down the mirrors to directly reduce the thermal vibration of the test masses.

Technical groups
Through its four technical working groups, the ET-FP7 project is addressing the basic questions in the realization of this proposed observatory: site location and characteristics (WP1), suspension design and technologies (WP2), detector topology and geometry (WP3), detection capabilities requirements and astrophysics potentialities (WP4).

Participants
ET is a design study project in the European Framework Programme (FP7). It has been proposed by 8 European leading gravitational wave experimental research institutes, coordinated by the European Gravitational Observatory:

  European Gravitational Observatory
  Istituto Nazionale di Fisica Nucleare
  Max-Planck-Gesellschaft zur Förderung der Wissenschaften e. V., acting through Max-Planck-Institut für Gravitationsphysik
  Centre National de la Recherche Scientifique
  University of Birmingham
  University of Glasgow
  Nikhef
  Cardiff University

Current design
Although still in the early design study phase, the basic parameters are established.

Like KAGRA, it will be located underground to reduce seismic noise and "gravity gradient noise" caused by nearby moving objects.

The arms will be 10 km long (compared to 4 km for LIGO, and 3 km for Virgo and KAGRA), and like LISA, there will be three arms in an equilateral triangle, with two detectors in each corner.

In order to measure the polarization of incoming gravitational waves and avoid having an orientation to which the telescope is insensitive, a minimum of two detectors are required.  While this could be done with two 90° interferometers at 45° to each other, the triangular form allows the arms to be shared.  The 60° arm angle reduces each interferometer's sensitivity, but that is made up for by the third detector, and the additional redundancy provides a useful cross-check.

Each of the three detectors would be composed of two interferometers, one optimized for operation below 30 Hz and one optimized for operation at higher frequencies.

The high-frequency ones (10 Hz to 10 kHz) will use room-temperature optics and a much higher recirculating beam power of 3 MW.

ETpathfinder
A prototype, or testing facility, called the ETpathfinder was built at Maastricht University's Randwyck Campus in the Netherlands. The facility was opened in November 2021 by Dutch Minister of Education, Culture and Science, Ingrid van Engelshoven. Project leader is Professor Stefan Hild. ETpathfinder will be a useful research centre in its own right after the ET has been built. The candidate sites for the ET are the Maastricht region (Meuse–Rhine Euroregion), Sardinia, and Saxony.

The Italian proposal 
The Italian government is ready to support the candidacy of Sos Enattos (Sardinia) as a place for the construction of the telescope together with the nobel prize for physics Giorgio Parisi.

Sos Enattos was chosen for the functional characteristics of the project of the site on the island:

 It has been classified as one of the quietest places on earth: the seismic activity that interferes with the detection of gravitational waves is essentially nil.
 The presence of an underground mine that would be used for the allocation of the telescope: the solidity and stability of the rock make it possible to build large underground quarries with confidence.
 The presence of groundwater in the area reduces the possibility of having problems with infiltration or seismic and Newtonian noise.
 The impact on employment would be impressive: in the 9 years of construction, considering direct and induced effects, employment is estimated at 36,000 units, with a local induced (65-75% of the total amount) equal to a turnover of 4.329 billion euros.

In January 2021 seismological surveys were carried out to validate the site, installing 15 seismometric stations near the Sos Enattos mine.

In September 2022, the Draghi government mandated the president of INFN Antonio Zoccoli to proceed with the creation of Italy's candidacy dossier, confirming the 350 million euro of economic commitment already allocated by the Sardinia Region.

See also

Tests of general relativity
EGO, the European Gravitational Observatory
LIGO, two gravitational wave detectors located in the United States
Virgo, a gravitational wave detector located in Italy
GEO 600, a gravitational wave detector located in Hannover, Germany
Cosmic Explorer, a proposed third generation ground-based gravitational wave observatory
Einstein@Home, a volunteer distributed computing program to help the LIGO/GEO teams analyze their data

References

Further reading
 Fundamentals of Interferometric Gravitational Wave Detectors by Peter R. Saulson, .
 Einstein's Unfinished Symphony by Marcia Bartusiak, .
 Gravity's Shadow: The Search for Gravitational Waves by Harry Collins, .
 Traveling at the Speed of Thought by Daniel Kennefick, .
 Einstein gravitational wave Telescope conceptual design study ET-0106C-10.

Interferometric gravitational-wave instruments
FP7 projects
Astronomical interferometers
Proposed infrastructure in Europe